The 2005 IIHF European Women's Champions Cup was the second holding of the IIHF European Women's Champions Cup (EWCC) ice hockey club tournament. AIK IF Solna of Sweden's Riksserien won the tournament for the second consecutive time.

Each of the Qualification groups and the Super Final were played as single round-robin tournaments. Points were awarded by match outcome: two points for a regulation win, one point for an overtime win or loss, and no points/zero points for a regulation loss. As the defending cup holders, AIK IF progressed directly to the Super Final and did not participate in the qualification round.

Qualification

The qualification round was played in three groups in three host cities during 13–16 October 2005. The team with the highest point total in each round-robin group moved on to the Finals.

Group A
Group A was hosted in Tallinn, Estonia and played during 14–16 October 2005. The Espoo Blues Naiset of Finland's Naisten SM-sarja won the round and progressed to the Final.

Group B
Group B was played during 13–15 October 2005 and hosted in Bolzano, Italy, though no Italian teams participated. SKIF Moscow of the Russian Women's Hockey League won the round and progressed to the Final.

Group C
Group C was hosted in Unna, Germany, and played during 14–16 October 2005. EV Zug Damen of Switzerland's Leistungsklasse A won the round and progressed to the Final.

Super Final
The Super Final was hosted in Solna, Sweden, the same host city as the 2004–05 EWCC Final, and was played during 2–4 December 2005. AIK IF Solna of Sweden's Riksserien won the Cup for the second time. Karoliina Rantamäki of the Espoo Blues was the top scorer of the Super Final with five points (1+4).

Statistics

Top scorers 
Abbreviations: GP = games played, G = goals, A = assists, Pts = points, +/- = plus–minus, PIM = penalty infraction minutes; Bold: Best of tournament

Top goaltenders 
Abbreviations: GP = games played, TOI = time on ice (in minutes), GA = goals against, SO = shutouts, SV% = save percentage, GAA = goals against average; Bold: Best of tournament

Best Players Selected by the Directorate

References
Content in this edit is translated from the existing German Wikipedia article at :de:IIHF European Women Champions Cup 2005; see its history for attribution.

Tournament statistics and data from:
 Coupe d'Europe féminine des clubs champions 2005/06. hockeyarchives.info (in French). Retrieved 2020-03-25.
 EWCC (W) - 2005-2006 Standings. eliteprospects.com. Retrieved 2020-03-26.

Women
2005
Euro